Changhai County is a county under the administration of Dalian, Liaoning province, China. It consists of several islands in the Yellow Sea and is located offshore of the Liaodong Peninsula. There are 112 small islands and reefs in the county, traditionally called the Outer Long Mountains Island Chain and formerly sometimes called the Elliot Islands.

Administrative divisions
There are 5 towns in the county.

Towns:
Dachangshandao
Zhangzidao
Guangludao
Xiaochangshandao
Haiyangdao

Climate

Transport
Changhai Airport

References

External links

Islands of the Yellow Sea
Island counties of China
Districts of Dalian